Hull Minster is the Anglican minster and the parish church of Kingston upon Hull in the East Riding of Yorkshire, England. The church was called Holy Trinity Church until 13 May 2017 when it became Hull Minster.

History
It is the largest parish church in England by floor area. The church dates back to about 1300 and contains what is widely acknowledged to be some of the finest medieval brick-work in the country, particularly in the transepts. The Minster Church is a Grade I listed building.

The Minster Church is a member of the Greater Churches Group.

William Wilberforce, who led the parliamentary campaign against the slave trade, was baptised in Holy Trinity Church in 1759.

In November 2014 plans were unveiled to reorder the church, creating an outstanding venue for performances, exhibitions and banquets, a visitor destination, and a place where those in need of help can find assistance.  The aim was to create a place for the whole community, and a venue that would be a driving force in the regeneration of Hull's Old Town. The transformation, costing a total of £4.5 million, was to take place in phases from 2016 onwards, the first being ready for Hull's role as UK City of Culture in 2017.

On 7 November 2016 the Archbishop of York, John Sentamu, announced that the church would be given Minster status in a ceremony on 13 May 2017. Sentamu came to Hull on 13 May in a flotilla of boats with a lantern lit at All Saints' Church, Hessle, to rededicate the church as Hull Minster.

In March 2019 the Minster received a grant of £3.9 million from Highways England to create a visitor centre, café and exhibition spaces.

List of vicars

 1326 Robert de Marton
 1345 Peter de Aslaksby
      Peter de Walton
 1349 Thomas de Baynbriggs
 1349 Robert de Thornton
 1362 John de Hurtheworth
 1364 Richard Lestebury
      John Stayngreve
 1391 Richard Marke
 1400 John de Barton
 1416 Thomas de Esyngwald
 1420 Thomas Bywell
 1433 Thomas de Bewyk
 1444 Thomas Delyngton
 1455 John Harewode
 1467 William Meryngton
 1468 John Yolton
 1492 Robert Hedlam
 1503 James Cokerell
 1519 George Dent
 1522 Thomas Logan
 1538 William Peres
 1557 Thomas Fugall
 1561 Melchior Smyth
 1591 Theophilus Smyth
 1615 Richard Perrott
 1642 William Styles
 1689 Robert Banks
 1715 John Wilkinson
 1715 Charles Mace
 1721 William Mason
 1753 Arthur Robinson
 1783 Thomas Clarke
 1797 Joseph Milner
 1797 John Healey Bromby
 1867 Richard England Brooke
 1875 Joseph M'Cormick
 1894 John William Mills
 1895 Joshua Hughes-Games
 1904 Arthur Blackwell Goulburn Lillingston
 1914 Louis George Buchanan
 1924 Cecil Francis Ayerst
 1927 William Seldon Morgan
 1937 Frederick Boreham
 1947 Leslie Oldfield Kenyon
 1956 Reginald Iliff
 1967 Gerald Bernard Bridgman
 1988 John Watson Waller
 2002 James Oliphant Forrester
 2010 Neal Duncan Barnes
 2020 Dominic Paul Black

Organ

Whilst there is reference to a John Raper of Hull submitting designs for an organ in 1622, no organ was ever built. The first organ is believed to have been the work of Father Bernard Smith in 1711, an organ he built originally for St Paul's Cathedral London, but which was subsequently removed from there as being too small. This organ was further enlarged by John Snetzler during the 18th century. Ryley of York produced a new organ in 1788. Forster & Andrews built and enlarged organs between 1845 and 1908, their last organ providing the basis for the present substantially enlarged organ of 4-manuals and 104 speaking stops by the John Compton Organ Company in 1938.

A specification of the organ can be found on the National Pipe Organ Register.

Organists

 Mr. Baker ???? – 1715
 George Smith 1715–1717
 Musgrave Heighington 1717–1720 (later organist of St Nicholas Church, Great Yarmouth)
 William Avison 1720–1751
 Matthias Hawdon 1751–1769 (later organist of Beverley Minster)
 John Hudson 1768–1787
 Thomas Hawdon 1787–1789
 George Lambert 1789–1838
 George James Skelton 1838–1851 – 1868
 Thomas Craddock 1868–1875
 G.E. Jackman 1875–1881
 Fred K. Bentley 1881 – 1921 – 1929
 Norman Ewart Strafford 1929–1951
 Peter Goodman 1951–1961 (previously organist of Guildford Cathedral)
 Ronald Arthur Styles 1961–1977
 Desmond Swinburn 1977–1986
 Julian Savory 1986–1991
 John Pemberton 1991
 Alan Dance, 1991–1999
 Roland Dee 1999–2004
 Paul Derrett and Serena Derrett 2005 – 2007
 Serena Derrett – Director of Music 2007 – 2015 (now known as Jerome Robertson)
 Mark Keith – Organist 2007 –

Organ Scholars
David Thomas since September 2011
Richard Harrison Cowley since May 2017
Niamh Drew since September 2021

Gallery

See also
Grade I listed churches in the East Riding of Yorkshire
Hull Trinity House

References

External links

Official website

 Photos

Holy Trinity Church
Church of England church buildings in the East Riding of Yorkshire
Grade I listed churches in the East Riding of Yorkshire